Andrei Ivanovich Otyutsky (born 27 April 1982) is a former Russian professional footballer.

Club career
He made his debut in the Russian Premier League in 2001 for FC Dynamo Moscow.

Honours
 Russian Second Division, Zone South best defender: 2010.

References

1982 births
People from Armavir, Russia
Living people
Russian footballers
FC Dynamo Moscow players
FC Luch Vladivostok players
FC SKA Rostov-on-Don players
FC Salyut Belgorod players
Russian Premier League players
FC Chernomorets Novorossiysk players
FC Volgar Astrakhan players
FC Sodovik Sterlitamak players
FC Armavir players
Association football defenders
Sportspeople from Krasnodar Krai